Kraska may refer to:

People 
Jakub Kraska (born 2000), Polish swimmer
James Kraska, American specialist in public international maritime law 
Jerzy Kraska (born 1951), Polish footballer
Tim Kraska, German computer scientist
Waldemar Kraska (born 1963), Polish politician

Places
Kraska, Podlaskie Voivodeship, village in Poland
Kraška Vas, village in Slovenia